Nashville is the capital city of the U.S. state of Tennessee and the seat of Davidson County. With a population of 689,447 at the 2020 U.S. census, Nashville is the most populous city in the state, 21st most-populous city in the U.S., and the fourth most populous city in the southeastern U.S. Located on the Cumberland River, the city is the center of the Nashville metropolitan area, which is one of the fastest growing in the nation.

Named for Francis Nash, a general of the Continental Army during the American Revolutionary War, the city was founded in 1779. The city grew quickly due to its strategic location as a port on the Cumberland River and, in the 19th century, a railroad center. Nashville seceded with Tennessee during the American Civil War; in 1862 it was the first state capital in the Confederacy to be taken by Union forces. After the war, the city reclaimed its position and developed a manufacturing base.

Since 1963, Nashville has had a consolidated city-county government, which includes six smaller municipalities in a two-tier system. The city is governed by a mayor, a vice-mayor, and a 40-member metropolitan council; 35 of the members are elected from single-member districts, while the other five are elected at-large. Reflecting the city's position in state government, Nashville is home to the Tennessee Supreme Court's courthouse for Middle Tennessee, one of the state's three divisions.

Nashville is considered a global city type "Gamma" by the GaWC as of 2020. A major center for the music industry, especially country music, Nashville is commonly known as "Music City". It is home to three major professional sports teams, the Predators, Titans, and Nashville SC. Nashville is also home to numerous colleges and universities, including Tennessee State University, Vanderbilt University, Belmont University, Fisk University, Trevecca Nazarene University, and Lipscomb University. Nashville is sometimes referred to as the "Athens of the South" due to the large number of educational institutions. The city is also a major center for the healthcare, publishing, banking, automotive, technology, and transportation industries. Entities with headquarters in the city include AllianceBernstein, Asurion, Bridgestone Americas, Captain D's, Hospital Corporation of America, LifeWay Christian Resources, Logan's Roadhouse, and Ryman Hospitality Properties.

History

18th and 19th centuries
In 1689, French-Canadian trader Martin Chartier established a trading post on the Cumberland River, near the present-day site of the city. In 1714, a group of French traders under the command of Charles Charleville established a settlement and trading post at the present location of downtown Nashville, which became known as French Lick. These settlers quickly established an extensive fur trading network with the local Native Americans, but by the 1740s the settlement had largely been abandoned.

In 1779, explorers James Robertson and John Donelson led a party of Overmountain Men to the site of French Lick, and constructed Fort Nashborough. It was named for Francis Nash, the American Revolutionary War hero. Nashville quickly grew because of its strategic location as a port on the Cumberland River, a tributary of the Ohio River; and its later status as a major railroad center. By 1800, the city had 345 residents, including 136 enslaved African Americans and 14 free African Americans. In 1806, Nashville was incorporated as a city and became the county seat of Davidson County, Tennessee. In 1843, the city was named as the permanent capital of the state of Tennessee.  Knoxville, Kingston & Murfreesboro were prior locations of the state capital.

The city government of Nashville owned 24 slaves by 1831, and 60 prior to the Civil War. They were "put to work to build the first successful water system and maintain the streets." Auction blocks and brokers' offices were part of the slave market at the heart of the city. It was the center of plantations cultivating tobacco and hemp as commodity crops, in addition to the breeding and training of thoroughbred horses, and other livestock. For years Nashville was considered one of the wealthiest southern capitals and a large portion of its prominence was from the iron business. Nashville led the south for iron production.

The cholera epidemic that struck Nashville in 1849–1850 took the life of former U.S. President James K. Polk and resulted in high fatalities. There were 311 deaths from cholera in 1849 and an estimated 316 to about 500 in 1850.

Before the Civil War, about 700 free Blacks lived in small enclaves in northern Nashville. More than 3,200 enslaved African Americans lived in the city. By 1860, when the first rumblings of secession began to be heard across the South, antebellum Nashville was a prosperous city.

The city's significance as a shipping port and rail center made it a desirable prize for competing military forces that wanted to control the region's important river and railroad transportation routes. In February 1862, Nashville became the first Confederate state capital to fall to Union troops, and the state was occupied by Union troops for the duration of the war. Many enslaved African Americans from Middle Tennessee fled as refugees to Union lines; they were housed in contraband camps around military installations in Nashville's eastern, western, and southern borders. The Battle of Nashville (December 15–16, 1864) was a significant Union victory and perhaps the most decisive tactical victory gained by either side in the war; it was also the war's final major military action in which Tennessee regiments played a large part on both sides of the battle. Afterward, the Confederates conducted a war of attrition, making guerrilla raids and engaging in small skirmishes. Confederate forces in the Deep South were almost constantly in retreat.

In 1868, three years after the end of the Civil War, the Nashville chapter of the Ku Klux Klan was founded by Confederate veteran John W. Morton. He was reported to have initiated General Nathan Bedford Forrest into the vigilante organization. The latter became Grand Wizard of the organization, which had chapters of this secret, insurgent group forming throughout the state and across the South. They opposed voting and political organizing by freedmen, tried to control their behavior by threats, violence and murder, and sometimes also attacked their White allies, including schoolteachers from the North and Freedman's Bureau officials.

Whites directed violence against freedmen and their descendants both during and after the Reconstruction era. Two freedmen, David Jones and Jo Reed, were lynched in Nashville by White mobs in 1872 and 1875, respectively. Reed was hanged from a bridge over the river, but survived after the rope broke and he fell into the water. He successfully escaped the city soon thereafter.

In 1873, Nashville suffered another cholera epidemic, along with towns throughout Sumner County along railroad routes and the Cumberland River. This was part of a larger epidemic that struck the Mississippi Valley system and other areas of the United States, such as New York and towns along its major lakes and rivers. The epidemic is estimated to have killed around 1,000 people in Nashville, and 50,000 total.

Meanwhile, the city had reclaimed its important shipping and trading position and developed a solid manufacturing base. The post–Civil War years of the late 19th century brought new prosperity to Nashville and Davidson County. Wealthy planters and businessmen built grand, classical-style buildings. A replica of the Parthenon was constructed in Centennial Park, near downtown.

On April 30, 1892, Ephraim Grizzard, an African-American man, was lynched in a spectacle murder in front of a European-American mob of 10,000 in Nashville. He was a suspect in the assault of two white sisters. His lynching was described by journalist Ida B. Wells as: "A naked, bloody example of the blood-thirstiness of the nineteenth century civilization of the Athens of the South." His brother, Henry Grizzard, had been lynched and hanged on April 24, 1892, in nearby Goodlettsville as a suspect in the same assault incident. From 1877 to 1950, a total of six lynchings of Blacks were conducted in Davidson County, four before the turn of the century.

Earlier 20th century

By the turn of the century Nashville was home to numerous organizations and individuals associated with revisionist Lost Cause of the Confederacy pseudohistory, and it has been referred to as the "cradle of the Lost Cause." In 1893, the magazine Confederate Veteran began publication in the city. In 1894, the first chapter of United Daughters of the Confederacy was founded in the city, and it hosted the first two conventions of the organization. Prominent proponents of the mythology, the so-called "guardians of the Lost Cause," were concentrated Downtown and in the West End, near Centennial Park.

At the same time, Jefferson Street became the historic center of the African American community, with similar districts developing in the Black neighborhoods in East and North Nashville. In 1912, the Tennessee Agricultural and Industrial and Normal School was moved to Jefferson Street. The first Prince's Hot Chicken Shack originated at the corner of Jefferson Street and 28th Avenue in 1945. Jefferson Street became a destination for jazz and blues musicians, and remained so until the federal government split the area by construction of Interstate 40 in the late 1960s.

In 1950, the state legislature approved a new city charter that provided for the election of city council members from single-member districts, rather than at-large voting. This change was supported because at-large voting required candidates to gain a majority of votes from across the city. The previous system prevented the minority population, which then tended to support Republican candidates, from being represented by candidates of their choice; apportionment under single-member districts meant that some districts in Nashville had Black majorities. In 1951, after passage of the new charter, African American attorneys Z. Alexander Looby and Robert E. Lillard were elected to the city council.

With the United States Supreme Court ruling in 1954 that public schools had to desegregate with "all deliberate speed", the family of student Robert Kelley filed a lawsuit in 1956, arguing that Nashville administrators should open all-White East High School to him. A similar case was filed by Reverend Henry Maxwell due to his children having to take a 45-minute bus ride from South Nashville to the north end of the city. These suits caused the courts to announce what became known as the "Nashville Plan", where the city's public schools would desegregate one grade per year beginning in the fall of 1957.

Urban redevelopment accelerated over the next several decades, and the city grew increasingly segregated. An interstate was placed on the edge of East Nashville while another highway was built through Edgehill, a lower-income, predominantly minority community.

Postwar development to present
Rapid suburbanization occurred during the years immediately after World War II, as new housing was being built outside city limits. This resulted in a demand for many new schools and other support facilities, which the county found difficult to provide. At the same time, suburbanization led to a declining tax base in the city, although many suburban residents used unique city amenities and services that were supported financially only by city taxpayers. After years of discussion, a referendum was held in 1958 on the issue of consolidating city and county government. It failed to gain approval although it was supported by the then-elected leaders of both jurisdictions, County Judge Beverly Briley and Mayor Ben West.

Following the referendum's failure, Nashville annexed some 42 square miles of suburban jurisdictions to expand its tax base. This increased uncertainty among residents, and created resentment among many suburban communities. Under the second charter for metropolitan government, which was approved in 1962, two levels of service provision were proposed: the General Services District and the Urban Services District, to provide for a differential in tax levels. Residents of the Urban Services District had a full range of city services. The areas that made up the General Services District, however, had a lower tax rate until full services were provided. This helped reconcile aspects of services and taxation among the differing jurisdictions within the large metro region.

In the early 1960s, Tennessee still had racial segregation of public facilities, including lunch counters and department store fitting rooms. Hotels and restaurants were also segregated. Between February 13 and May 10, 1960, a series of sit-ins were organized at lunch counters in downtown Nashville by the Nashville Student Movement and Nashville Christian Leadership Council, and were part of a broader sit-in movement in the southeastern United States as part of an effort to end racial segregation of public facilities. On April 19, 1960, the house of Z. Alexander Looby, an African American attorney and council member, was bombed by segregationists. Protesters marched to the city hall the next day. Mayor Ben West said he supported the desegregation of lunch counters, which civil rights activists had called for.

In 1963, Nashville consolidated its government with Davidson County, forming a metropolitan government. The membership on the Metro Council, the legislative body, was increased from 21 to 40 seats. Of these, five members are elected at-large and 35 are elected from single-member districts, each to serve a term of four years. In 1957 Nashville desegregated its school system using an innovative grade a year plan, in response to a class action suit Kelly vs. Board of Education of Nashville.    By 1966 the Metro Council abandoned the grade a year plan and completely desegregated the entire school system at one time.

Congress passed civil rights legislation in 1964 and 1965, but tensions continued as society was slow to change. On April 8, 1967, a riot broke out on the college campuses of Fisk University and Tennessee State University, historically Black colleges, after Stokely Carmichael spoke about Black Power at Vanderbilt University. Although it was viewed as a "race riot", it had classist characteristics.

In 1979, the Ku Klux Klan burnt crosses outside two African American sites in Nashville, including the city headquarters of the NAACP.

Since the 1970s, the city and county have undergone tremendous growth, particularly during the economic boom of the 1990s under the leadership of then-Mayor and later-Tennessee Governor, Phil Bredesen. Making urban renewal a priority, Bredesen fostered the construction or renovation of several city landmarks, including the Country Music Hall of Fame and Museum, the downtown Nashville Public Library, the Bridgestone Arena, and Nissan Stadium.

Nissan Stadium (formerly Adelphia Coliseum and LP Field) was built after the National Football League's (NFL) Houston Oilers agreed to move to the city in 1995. The NFL team debuted in Nashville in 1998 at Vanderbilt Stadium, and Nissan Stadium opened in the summer of 1999. The Oilers changed their name to the Tennessee Titans and finished the season with the Music City Miracle and a close Super Bowl game. The St. Louis Rams won in the last play of the game.

In 1997, Nashville was awarded a National Hockey League expansion team; this was named the Nashville Predators. Since the 2003–04 season, the Predators have made the playoffs in all but three seasons. In 2017, they made the Stanley Cup Finals for the first time in franchise history, but ultimately fell to the Pittsburgh Penguins, 4games to 2, in the best-of-seven series.

21st century
On January 22, 2009, residents rejected Nashville Charter Amendment 1, which sought to make English the official language of the city.

Between May 1 and 7, 2010, much of Nashville was extensively flooded as part of a series of 1,000 year floods throughout Middle and West Tennessee. Much of the flooding took place in areas along the Cumberland and Harpeth Rivers and Mill Creek, and caused extensive damage to the many buildings and structures in the city, including the Grand Ole Opry House, Gaylord Opryland Resort & Convention Center, Opry Mills Mall, Schermerhorn Symphony Center, Bridgestone Arena, and Nissan Stadium. Sections of Interstate 24 and Briley Parkway were also flooded. Eleven people died in the Nashville area as a result of the flooding, and damages were estimated to be over $2 billion.

The city recovered after the Great Recession. In March 2012, a Gallup poll ranked Nashville in the top five regions for job growth. In 2013, Nashville was described as "Nowville" and "It City" by GQ, Forbes, and The New York Times.

Nashville elected its first female mayor, Megan Barry, on September 25, 2015. As a council member, Barry had officiated at the city's first same-sex wedding on June 26, 2015.

In 2017, Nashville's economy was deemed the third fastest-growing in the nation, and the city was named the "hottest housing market in the US" by Freddie Mac realtors. In May 2017, census estimates showed Nashville had passed Memphis to become most populated city in Tennessee. Nashville has also made national headlines for its "homelessness crisis". Rising housing prices and the opioid crisis have resulted in more people being out on the streets: , between 2,300 and 20,000 Nashvillians are homeless.

On March 6, 2018, due to felony charges filed against Mayor Barry relating to the misuse of public funds, she resigned before the end of her term. A special election was called. Following a ruling by the Tennessee Supreme Court, the Davidson County Election Commission set the special election for May 24, 2018, to meet the requirement of 75 to 80 days from the date of resignation. David Briley, who was Vice Mayor during the Barry administration and Acting Mayor after her resignation, won the special election with just over 54% of the vote, becoming the 70th mayor of Nashville.

On May 1, 2018, voters rejected Let's Move Nashville, a referendum which would have funded construction of an $8.9 billion mass transit system under the Nashville Metropolitan Transit Authority, by a 2 to 1 margin.

On September 28, 2019, John Cooper became the ninth mayor of Metropolitan Government of Nashville and Davidson County.

On March 3, 2020, a tornado tracked west to east, just north of the downtown Nashville area, killing at least 25 people and leaving tens of thousands without electricity.  Neighborhoods impacted included North Nashville, Germantown, East Nashville, Donelson, and Hermitage.

On December 25, 2020, a vehicle exploded on Second Avenue, killing the perpetrator and injuring eight others.

Geography

Topography

Nashville lies on the Cumberland River in the northwestern portion of the Nashville Basin. Nashville also sits at the start of the Highland Rim, a geophysical region of very hilly land. Because of this, Nashville is very hilly. Nashville also has some stand alone hills around the city such as the hill on which the Tennessee State Capitol building sits.

Cityscape

Nashville's downtown area features a diverse assortment of entertainment, dining, cultural and architectural attractions. The Broadway and 2nd Avenue areas feature entertainment venues, night clubs and an assortment of restaurants. North of Broadway lie Nashville's central business district, Legislative Plaza, Capitol Hill and the Tennessee Bicentennial Mall. Cultural and architectural attractions can be found throughout the city.

Three major interstate highways (I-40, I-65 and I-24) converge near the core area of downtown, and many regional cities are within a day's driving distance.

Nashville's first skyscraper, the Life & Casualty Tower, was completed in 1957 and launched the construction of other high rises in downtown Nashville. After the construction of the AT&T Building (commonly referred to by locals as the "Batman Building") in 1994, the downtown area saw little construction until the mid-2000s. The Pinnacle, a high rise office building which opened in 2010, was the first skyscraper in Nashville to be built in the preceding 15 years.

Since 2000, Nashville has seen two urban construction booms (one prior to the Great Recession and the other after) that have yielded multiple high-rises (defined by Emporis as buildings of a minimum of 115 feet tall). Of the city's 37 towers of 280 feet tall or taller, 24 have been completed since 2000.

Many civic and infrastructure projects are being planned, in progress, or recently completed. A new MTA bus hub was recently completed in downtown Nashville, as was the Music City Star pilot project. Several public parks have been constructed, such as the Public Square. Riverfront Park is scheduled to be extensively updated. The Music City Center opened in May 2013.

Neighborhoods

 12South
 Antioch
 Belmont-Hillsboro
 Belle Meade
 Bellevue
 Berry Hill
 Bordeaux
 Buena Vista
 Cane Ridge
 Cleveland Park
 Crieve Hall
 Donelson
 East Nashville
 Edgehill
 Five Points/East End
 Germantown
 Green Hills
 The Gulch
 Hermitage
 Hillsboro Village
 Hope Gardens
 Inglewood
 Joelton
 Lakewood
 Lockeland Springs
 Madison
 McFerrin Park
 North Nashville
 Oak Hill
 Old Hickory
 Richland/Cherokee Park
 SoBro
 Sylvan Heights
 Sylvan Park
 The Nations
 Tusculum
 Whitland
 Woodbine
 Woodland-in-Waverly
 Whites Creek
 West Meade
 West Nashville

Flora
The nearby city of Lebanon is notable and even named for its so-called "cedar glades", which occur on soils too poor to support most trees and are instead dominated by Virginian juniper. Blackberry bushes, Virginia pine, loblolly pine, sassafras, red maple, river birch, American beech, river cane, mountain laurel and sycamore are all common native trees, along with many others.

In addition to the native forests, the combination of hot summers, abundant rainfall and mild winters permit a wide variety of both temperate and subtropical plants to be cultivated easily. Southern magnolia and cherry blossom trees are commonly cultivated here, with the city having an annual cherry blossom festival. Crepe myrtles and yew bushes are also commonly grown throughout Metro Nashville, and the winters are mild enough that sweetbay magnolia is evergreen whenever it is cultivated. The pansy flower is popular to plant during the autumn, and some varieties will flower overwinter in Nashville's subtropical climate. However, many hot-weather plants like petunia and even papyrus thrive as annuals, and Japanese banana will die aboveground during winter but re-sprout after the danger of frost is over. Unbeknownst to most Tennesseans, even cold-hardy palms, particularly needle palm and dwarf palmetto, are grown uncommonly but often successfully. High desert plants like Colorado spruce and prickly pear cactus are also grown somewhat commonly, as are Yucca filamentosa.

Climate

Nashville International Airport in Donelson has a humid subtropical climate (Köppen Cfa, Trewartha Cf), with hot, humid summers and generally cool winters typical of the Upper South.

Snowfall occurs during the winter months, but it is usually not heavy.

Rainfall is typically greater in solar spring (Feb-Apr) and summer (May-Jul), while the solar autumn months (Aug-Oct) are the driest on average. Spring and fall are prone to severe thunderstorms, which may bring tornadoes, large hail, flash floods and damaging wind, with recent major events on April 16, 1998; April 7, 2006; February 5, 2008; April 10, 2009; May 1–2, 2010; and March 3, 2020. Relative humidity in Nashville averages 83% in the mornings and 60% in the afternoons, which is considered moderate for the Southeastern United States. In recent decades, due to urban development, Nashville has developed an urban heat island; especially on cool, clear nights, temperatures are up to  warmer in the heart of the city than in rural outlying areas. The Nashville region lies within USDA Plant Hardiness Zone 7a.  From 1970 to 2020 the average summer temperature has risen 2.8 degrees.

Nashville's long springs and autumns combined with a diverse array of trees and grasses can often make it uncomfortable for allergy sufferers. In 2008, Nashville was ranked as the 18th-worst spring allergy city in the U.S. by the Asthma and Allergy Foundation of America.

Donelson
Diurnal temperature variation is highest in April and lowest in December, but it is also relatively high in October and relatively low in January. Donelson's climate classifications are Köppen Cfa and Trewartha CFak thanks to its very hot summers (average over ), mild winters (average over ) and long (8+ months) growing seasons (average over ). Precipitation is abundant year-round without any major difference, but there is still slight variation. The wet season runs from February through July, reaching its zenith in May with 128 mm of rain. The dry season runs from August through January with an October nadir of 85 mm and secondary December peak of 113 mm.

Old Hickory
Diurnal temperature variation is highest in April and lowest in January. Old Hickory's climate classifications are Köppen Cfa and Trewartha DOak thanks to its very hot summers (average over ), mild winters (average over ) and mediocre (4–7 months) growing seasons (average over ). Precipitation is abundant year-round without any major difference, but there is still slight variation. The wet season runs from February through July, reaching its zenith in April with 120 mm of rain. The dry season runs from August through January with an October/November nadir of 85 mm and secondary December peak of 113 mm.

Demographics

As of the 2020 United States census, there were 689,447 people, 279,545 households, and 146,241 families residing in the city. The population increase of 88,225, or 14.67% over the 2010 figure of 601,222 residents, represented the largest net population increase in the city's history.

In 2010, there were 254,651 households and 141,469 families (55.6% of households). Of households with families, 37.2% had married couples living together, 14.1% had a female householder with no husband present, and 4.2% had a male householder with no wife present. 27.9% of all households had children under the age of 18, and 18.8% had at least one member 65 years of age or older. Of the 44.4% of households that are non-families, 36.2% were individuals, and 8.2% had someone living alone who was 65 years of age or older. The average household size was 2.38 and the average family size was 3.16.

The age distribution was 22.2% under 18, 10.3% from 18 to 24, 32.8% from 25 to 44, 23.9% from 45 to 64, and 10.7% who were 65 or older. The median age was 34.2 years. For every 100 females, there were 94.1 males. For every 100 females age 18 and over, there were 91.7 males.

The median income for a household in the city was $46,141, and the median income for a family was $56,377. Males with a year-round, full-time job had a median income of $41,017 versus $36,292 for females. The per capita income for the city was $27,372. About 13.9% of families and 18.2% of the population were below the poverty line, including 29.5% of those under age 18 and 9.9% of those age 65 or over. Of residents 25 or older, 33.4% have a bachelor's degree or higher.

Because of its relatively low cost of living and large job market, Nashville has become a popular city for immigrants. Nashville's foreign-born population more than tripled in size between 1990 and 2000, increasing from 12,662 to 39,596. The city's largest immigrant groups include Mexicans, Kurds, Vietnamese, Laotians, Arabs, and Somalis. There are also smaller communities of Pashtuns from Afghanistan and Pakistan concentrated primarily in Antioch. Nashville has the largest Kurdish community in the United States, numbering approximately 15,000. In 2009, about 60,000 Bhutanese refugees were being admitted to the U.S., and some were expected to resettle in Nashville. During the Iraqi election of 2005, Nashville was one of the few international locations where Iraqi expatriates could vote. The American Jewish community in Nashville dates back over 150 years, and numbered about 8,000 in 2015, plus 2,000 Jewish college students.

Metropolitan area

, Nashville has the largest metropolitan area in the state of Tennessee, with a population of  1,989,519. The Nashville metropolitan area encompasses 13 of 41 Middle Tennessee counties: Cannon, Cheatham, Davidson, Dickson, Macon, Maury, Robertson, Rutherford, Smith, Sumner, Trousdale, Williamson, and Wilson. The 2020 population of the Nashville-Davidson–Murfreesboro–Columbia combined statistical area was 2,118,233.

Religion 
59.6% of people in Nashville claim religious affiliation according to information compiled by Sperling's BestPlaces. The dominant religion in Nashville is Christianity, comprising 57.7% of the population. The Christian population is broken down into 20.6% Baptists, 6.2% Catholics, 5.6% Methodists, 3.4% Pentecostals, 3.4% Presbyterians, 0.8% Mormons, and 0.5% Lutherans. 15.7% identify with other forms of Christianity, including the Orthodox Church and Disciples of Christ. Islam is the second largest religion, comprising 0.8% of the population. 0.6% of the population adhere to eastern religions such as Buddhism, Sikhism, Jainism and Hinduism, and 0.3% follow Judaism.

Economy

In the 21st century's second decade, Nashville was described as a "southern boomtown" by numerous publications. In 2017, it had the third-fastest-growing metropolitan  economy in the United States and "adds an average of 100 people a day to its net population increase". The Nashville region was also said to be the "Number One" Metro Area for Professional and Business Service Jobs in America,; Zillow said it had the "hottest Housing market in America". In 2013, the city ranked No. 5 on Forbes list of the Best Places for Business and Careers. In 2015, Forbes put Nashville as the fourth Best City for White Collar Jobs. In 2015, Business Facilities' 11th Annual Rankings report named Nashville the number one city for Economic Growth Potential.

Fortune 500 companies with offices within Nashville include BNY Mellon, Bridgestone Americas, Ernst & Young, Community Health Systems, Dell, Deloitte, Dollar General, Hospital Corporation of America, Nissan North America, Philips, Tractor Supply Company, and UBS. Of these, Community Health Systems, Dollar General, SmileDirectClub, Hospital Corporation of America, and Tractor Supply Company are headquartered in the city. Many popular food companies are based in Nashville including Captain D's, Hunt Brothers Pizza, O'Charley's, Logan's Roadhouse, J. Alexander's, and Stoney River Legendary Steaks.

As the "home of country music", Nashville has become a major music recording and production center. The Big Three record labels, as well as numerous independent labels, have offices in Nashville, mostly in the Music Row area. Nashville has been the headquarters of guitar company Gibson since 1984. Since the 1960s, Nashville has been the second-largest music production center (after New York City) in the United States. Nashville's music industry is estimated to have a total economic impact of about $10billion per year and to contribute about 56,000 jobs to the Nashville area.

The area's largest industry is health care. Nashville is home to more than 300 health care companies, including Hospital Corporation of America (HCA), the world's largest private operator of hospitals.

CoreCivic, formerly known as Corrections Corporation of America and one of the largest private corrections company in the United States, was founded in Nashville in 1983, but moved out of the city in 2019. Vanderbilt University was one of its investors before the company's initial public offering. The City of Nashville's pension fund included "a $921,000 stake" in the company in 2017. The Nashville Scene notes that, "A drop in CoreCivic stock value, however minor, would have a direct impact on the pension fund that represents nearly 25,000 current and former Metro employees."

The automotive industry is also becoming important for the Middle Tennessee region. Nissan North America moved its corporate headquarters in 2006 from Gardena, California (Los Angeles County) to Franklin, a suburb south of Nashville. Nissan's largest North American manufacturing plant is in Smyrna, another suburb of Nashville. Largely as a result of the increased development of Nissan and other Japanese economic interests in the region, Japan moved its former New Orleans consulate-general to Nashville's Palmer Plaza. Automotive parts manufacturer Bridgestone has its their North American headquarters in Nashville and manufacturing plants and a distribution center in nearby counties.

Other major industries in Nashville include insurance, finance, and publishing (especially religious publishing). The city hosts headquarters operations for several Protestant denominations, including the United Methodist Church, Southern Baptist Convention, National Baptist Convention USA, and the National Association of Free Will Baptists.

Nashville is known for Southern confections, including Goo Goo Clusters, which have been made in Nashville since 1912.

In May 2018, AllianceBernstein pledged to build a private client office in the city by mid-2019 and to move its headquarters from New York City to Nashville by 2024.

The technology sector is an important and growing aspect of Nashville's economy. In November 2018, Amazon announced its plans to build an operations center in the Nashville Yards development to serve as the hub for their Retail Operations division. In April 2021, Oracle Corporation announced that it would construct a $1.2 billion campus in Nashville, which is expected to employ 8,500 by 2031.

In December 2019, iHeartMedia selected Nashville as the site of its second digital headquarters.

Real estate is becoming a driver for the city's economy. Based on a survey of nearly 1,500 real estate industry professionals conducted by PricewaterhouseCoopers and the Urban Land Institute, Nashville ranked seventh nationally in terms of attractiveness to real estate investors for 2016. , according to city figures, there is more than $2 billion in real estate projects underway or projected to start in 2016. Due to high yields available to investors, Nashville has been attracting a lot of capital from out-of-state. A key factor that has been attributed to the increase in investment is the adjustment to the city's zoning code. Developers can easily include a combination of residential, office, retail and entertainment space into their projects. Additionally, the city has invested heavily into public parks. Centennial Park is undergoing extensive renovations. The change in the zoning code and the investment in public space is consistent with the millennial generation's preference for walkable urban neighborhoods.

Top employers
According to the Nashville Business Journal, the top employers in the city are:

Culture

Much of the city's cultural life has revolved around its large university community. Particularly significant in this respect were two groups of critics and writers who were associated with Vanderbilt University in the early 20th century: the Fugitives and the Agrarians.

Popular destinations include Fort Nashborough and Fort Negley, the former being a reconstruction of the original settlement, the latter being a semi-restored Civil War battle fort; the Tennessee State Museum; and The Parthenon, a full-scale replica of the original Parthenon in Athens. The Tennessee State Capitol is one of the oldest working state capitol buildings in the nation. The Hermitage, the former home of President Andrew Jackson, is one of the largest presidential homes open to the public, and is also one of the most visited.

Dining
Some of the more popular types of local cuisine include hot chicken, hot fish, barbecue, and meat and three.

Entertainment and performing arts

Nashville has a vibrant music and entertainment scene spanning a variety of genres. With a long history in the music scene it is no surprise that city was nicknamed 'Music City.' The Tennessee Performing Arts Center is the major performing arts center of the city. It is the home of the Nashville Repertory Theatre, the Nashville Opera, the Music City Drum and Bugle Corps, and the Nashville Ballet. In September 2006, the Schermerhorn Symphony Center opened as the home of the Nashville Symphony.

As the city's name itself is a metonym for the country music industry, many popular attractions involve country music, including the Country Music Hall of Fame and Museum, Belcourt Theatre, and Ryman Auditorium. Hence, the city became known as America's 'Country Music Capital.' The Opry plays there several times a week, except for an annual winter run at the Ryman.

Many music clubs and honky-tonk bars are in downtown Nashville, particularly the area encompassing Lower Broadway, Second Avenue, and Printer's Alley, which is often referred to as "the District".

Each June, the CMA Music Festival (formerly known as Fan Fair) brings thousands of country fans to the city. The Tennessee State Fair is also held annually in September.

Nashville was once home of television shows such as Hee Haw and Pop! Goes the Country, as well as The Nashville Network and later, RFD-TV. Country Music Television and Great American Country currently operate from Nashville. The city was also home to the Opryland USA theme park, which operated from 1972 to 1997 before being closed by its owners (Gaylord Entertainment Company) and soon after demolished to make room for the Opry Mills mega-shopping mall.

The Contemporary Christian music industry is based along Nashville's Music Row, with a great influence in neighboring Williamson County. The Christian record companies include EMI Christian Music Group, Provident Label Group and Word Records.

Music Row houses many gospel music and Contemporary Christian music companies centered around 16th and 17th Avenues South. On River Road, off Charlotte Pike in West Nashville, the CabaRay opened its doors on January 18, 2018. The performing venue of Ray Stevens, it offers a Vegas-style dinner and a show atmosphere. There is also a piano bar and a gift shop.

Although Nashville was never known as a major jazz town, it did have many great jazz bands, including The Nashville Jazz Machine led by Dave Converse and its current version, the Nashville Jazz Orchestra, led by Jim Williamson, as well as The Establishment, led by Billy Adair. The Francis Craig Orchestra entertained Nashvillians from 1929 to 1945 from the Oak Bar and Grille Room in the Hermitage Hotel. Craig's orchestra was also the first to broadcast over local radio station WSM-AM and enjoyed phenomenal success with a 12-year show on the NBC Radio Network. In the late 1930s, he introduced a newcomer, Dinah Shore, a local graduate of Hume Fogg High School and Vanderbilt University.

Radio station WMOT-FM in nearby Murfreesboro, which formerly programmed jazz, aided significantly in the recent revival of the city's jazz scene, as has the non-profit Nashville Jazz Workshop, which holds concerts and classes in a renovated building in the north Nashville neighborhood of Germantown. Fisk University also maintains a jazz station, WFSK.

Nashville has an active theatre scene and is home to several professional and community theatre companies. Nashville Children's Theatre, Nashville Repertory Theatre, the Nashville Shakespeare Festival, the Dance Theatre of Tennessee and the Tennessee Women's Theater Project are among the most prominent professional companies. One community theatre, Circle Players, has been in operation for over 60 years.

The Barbershop Harmony Society has its headquarters in Nashville.

Tourism

Perhaps the biggest factor in drawing visitors to Nashville is its association with country music, in which the Nashville sound played a role. Many visitors to Nashville attend live performances of the Grand Ole Opry, the world's longest-running live radio show. The Country Music Hall of Fame and Museum is another major attraction relating to the popularity of country music. The Gaylord Opryland Resort & Convention Center, the Opry Mills regional shopping mall and the General Jackson showboat, are all located in what is known as Music Valley.

Civil War history is important to the city's tourism industry. Sites pertaining to the Battle of Nashville and the nearby Battle of Franklin and Battle of Stones River can be seen, along with several well-preserved antebellum plantation houses such as Belle Meade Plantation, Carnton plantation in Franklin, and Belmont Mansion.

Nashville has many arts centers and museums, including the Frist Center for the Visual Arts, Cheekwood Botanical Garden and Museum of Art, the Tennessee State Museum, the Johnny Cash Museum, Fisk University's Van Vechten and Aaron Douglas Galleries, Vanderbilt University's Fine Art Gallery and Sarratt Gallery, the National Museum of African American Music, and the full-scale replica of the Parthenon.

Nashville has become an increasingly popular destination for bachelor and bachelorette parties. In 2017, Nashville Scene counted 33 bachelorette parties on Lower Broadway ("from Fifth Avenue down to the Cumberland River, it's their town") in less than two hours on a Friday night, and stated that the actual number was likely higher. Downtown, the newspaper wrote, "offers five blocks of bars with live music and no cover". In 2018, The New York Times called Nashville "the hottest destination for bachelorette parties in the country" because of the honky-tonk bars' live music. City boosters welcome the bachelorette parties because temporary visitors may become permanent; BuzzFeed wrote, "These women are at precisely the point in their lives when a move to Nashville is possible". The CMT reality television series Bachelorette Weekend follows the employees at Bach Weekend, a Nashville company that designs and throws bachelor and bachelorette parties.

Major annual events

Nicknames
Nashville is a colorful, well-known city in several different arenas. As such, it has earned various sobriquets, including:
 Music City, U.S.A.: WSM-AM announcer David Cobb first used this name during a 1950 broadcast and it stuck. It is now the official nickname used by the Nashville Convention and Visitors Bureau. Nashville is the home of the Grand Ole Opry, the Country Music Hall of Fame, and many major record labels. This name also dates back to 1873, where after receiving and hearing a performance by the Fisk Jubilee Singers, Queen Victoria of the United Kingdom is reported as saying that "These young people must surely come from a musical city."
Athens of the South: Home to 24 post-secondary educational institutions, Nashville has long been compared to Athens, the ancient city of learning and site of Plato's Academy. Since 1897, a full-scale replica of the Athenian Parthenon has stood in Nashville, and many examples of classical and neoclassical architecture can be found in the city. The term was popularized by Philip Lindsley (1786–1855), President of the University of Nashville, though it is unclear whether he was the first person to use the phrase.
 The Protestant Vatican or The Buckle of the Bible Belt: Nashville has over 700 churches, several seminaries, a number of Christian music companies, and is the headquarters for the publishing arms of the Southern Baptist Convention (LifeWay Christian Resources), the United Methodist Church (United Methodist Publishing House) and the National Baptist Convention (Sunday School Publishing Board). It is also the seat of the National Baptist Convention, the National Association of Free Will Baptists, the Gideons International, the Gospel Music Association, and Thomas Nelson, the world's largest producer of Bibles.
 Cashville: Nashville native Young Buck released a successful rap album called Straight Outta Cashville that has popularized the nickname among a new generation.
 Little Kurdistan: Nashville has the United States' largest population of Kurdish people, estimated to be around 11,000.
 Nash Vegas or Nashvegas

Nashville has additionally earned the moniker "The Hot Chicken Capital", becoming known for the local specialty cuisine hot chicken. The Music City Hot Chicken Festival is hosted annually in Nashville and several restaurants make this spicy version of southern fried chicken.

Sports

Professional

Nashville is home to five professional sports franchises. Three play at the highest professional level of their respective sports: the Tennessee Titans of the National Football League (NFL), the Nashville Predators of the National Hockey League (NHL), and Nashville SC of Major League Soccer (MLS). The city is also home to two minor league teams: the Nashville Sounds of Minor League Baseball's International League and the Music City Fire arena football team of the American Arena League. An investment group, Music City Baseball, seeks to secure a Major League Baseball expansion franchise or lure an existing team to the city. The Women's Basketball National Association is considering a franchise expansion to Nashville.

The Tennessee Titans moved to Nashville in 1998. Previously known as the Houston Oilers, which began play in 1960 in Houston, Texas, the team relocated to Tennessee in 1997. They played at the Liberty Bowl Memorial Stadium in Memphis for one season, then moved to Nashville in 1998 and played in Vanderbilt Stadium for one season. During those two years, the team was known as the Tennessee Oilers, but changed its name to Titans in 1999. The team now plays at Nissan Stadium in Nashville, which opened in 1999. Since moving to Nashville, the Titans have won five division championships (2000, 2002, 2008, 2020, and 2021) and one conference championship (1999). They competed in 1999's Super Bowl XXXIV, losing to the St. Louis Rams, 23–16. The city previously hosted the 1939 Nashville Rebels of the American Football League and two Arena Football League teams named the Nashville Kats (1997–2001 and 2005–2007).

From April 25–27, 2019, Nashville hosted the 2019 NFL Draft, which saw an estimated 200,000 fans attend each day.

The Nashville Predators joined the National Hockey League as an expansion team in the 1998–99 season. The team plays its home games at Bridgestone Arena. The Predators have won two division championships (2017–18 and 2018–19) and one conference championship (2016–17).

Nashville SC, a Major League Soccer franchise, began play in 2020 at Nissan Stadium. It moved into the newly completed soccer-specific stadium Geodis Park at the Nashville Fairgrounds in 2022.

The Nashville Sounds baseball team was established in 1978 as an expansion franchise of the Double-A Southern League. The Sounds won the league championship in 1979 and 1982. In 1985, the Double-A Sounds were replaced by a Triple-A team of the American Association. After the circuit dissolved in 1997, they joined the Triple-A Pacific Coast League in 1998 and won the league championship in 2005. The Sounds left their original ballpark, Herschel Greer Stadium, in 2015 for First Horizon Park, a new ballpark built on the site of the former Sulphur Dell ballpark. In 2021, they were placed in the Triple-A East, which became the International League in 2022. In total, the Sounds have won eleven division titles and three league championships.

The Music City Fire, an arena football team of the American Arena League began play at the Williamson County AgExpo Park in 2020.

Nashville is the home of the second-oldest continually operating racetrack in the United States, the Fairgrounds Speedway. It hosted NASCAR Winston Cup races from 1958 to 1984, NASCAR Busch Series and NASCAR Truck Series in the 1980s and 1990s, and later the NASCAR Whelen All-American Series and ARCA Racing Series.

The track held NASCAR sanctioned events from 2001 to 2011 as well as IndyCar races from 2001 to 2008. Nashville Superspeedway will reopen in 2021 and host the premier NASCAR Cup Series for the first time.

The Nashville Invitational was a golf tournament on the PGA Tour from 1944 to 1946. The Sara Lee Classic was part of the LPGA Tour from 1988 to 2002. The BellSouth Senior Classic of the Champions Tour was held from 1994 to 2003. The Nashville Golf Open is part of the Web.com Tour since 2016. The 1961 Women's Western Open and 1980 U.S. Women's Open were also held in Nashville.

College and amateur
Nashville is also home to four Division I athletic programs. Nashville is also home to the NCAA college football Music City Bowl.

The Nashville Rollergirls are Nashville's only women's flat track roller derby team. Established in 2006, Nashville Rollergirls compete on a regional and national level. They play their home games at the Nashville Fairgrounds Sports Arena. In 2014, they hosted the WFTDA Championships at Municipal Auditorium.

The Nashville Kangaroos are an Australian Rules Football team that compete in the United States Australian Football League. The Kangaroos play their home games at Elmington Park. The team is the reigning USAFL Central Region Champions.

Three Little League Baseball teams from Nashville (one in 1970; one in 2013; and, one in 2014) have qualified for the Little League World Series. Teams from neighboring Goodlettsville qualified for the 2012 and 2016 series, giving the metropolitan area teams in three consecutive years to so qualify; and four teams in five years.

Parks and gardens

Metro Board of Parks and Recreation owns and manages  of land and 99 parks and greenways (comprising more than 3% of the total area of the county).

It is also the home of the annual Iroquois Steeplechase.

The United States Army Corps of Engineers maintains parks on Old Hickory Lake and Percy Priest Lake. These parks are used for activities such as fishing, water skiing, sailing and boating. The Harbor Island Yacht Club makes its headquarters on Old Hickory Lake, and Percy Priest Lake is home to the Vanderbilt Sailing Club and Nashville Shores.

Other parks in Nashville include Centennial Park, Shelby Park, Cumberland Park, and Radnor Lake State Natural Area.

On August 27, 2013, Nashville mayor Karl Dean revealed plans for two new riverfront parks on the east and west banks of the Cumberland River downtown. Construction on the east bank park began in the fall of 2013, and the projected completion date for the west bank park is 2015. Among many exciting benefits of this Cumberland River re-development project is the construction of a highly anticipated outdoor amphitheater. Located on the west bank, this music venue will be surrounded by a new  park and will replace the previous thermal plant site. It will include room for 6,500 spectators with 2,500 removable seats and additional seating on an overlooking grassy knoll. In regard to the parks' benefits for Nashvillian civilians, Mayor Dean remarked that "if done right, the thermal site can be an iconic park that generations of Nashvillians will be proud of and which they can enjoy".

Law and government

The city of Nashville and Davidson County merged in 1963 as a way for Nashville to combat the problems of urban sprawl. The combined entity is officially known as "the Metropolitan Government of Nashville and Davidson County", and is popularly known as "Metro Nashville" or simply "Metro". It offers services such as police, fire, electricity, water and sewage treatment. When the Metro government was formed in 1963, the government was split into two service districts—the "urban services district" and the "general services district." There are six smaller municipalities within the consolidated city-county: Belle Meade, Berry Hill, Forest Hills, Oak Hill, Goodlettsville (partially), and Ridgetop (partially). These municipalities use a two-tier system of government, with the smaller municipality typically providing police services and the Metro Nashville government providing most other services. Previously, the city of Lakewood also had a separate charter. However, Lakewood residents voted in 2010 and 2011 to dissolve its city charter and join the metropolitan government, with both votes passing.

Nashville is governed by a mayor, vice-mayor, and 40-member Metropolitan Council. It uses the strong-mayor form of the mayor–council system. The current mayor of Nashville is John Cooper. The Metropolitan Council is the legislative body of government for Nashville and Davidson County. There are five council members who are elected at large and 35 council members that represent individual districts. The Metro Council has regular meetings that are presided over by the vice-mayor, who is currently Jim Shulman. The Metro Council meets on the first and third Tuesday of each month at 6:00pm, according to the Metropolitan Charter.

Nashville is home to the Tennessee Supreme Court's courthouse for Middle Tennessee and the Estes Kefauver Federal Building and United States Courthouse, home of the United States District Court for the Middle District of Tennessee.

Politics

Nashville has been a Democratic stronghold since at least the end of Reconstruction, and has remained staunchly Democratic even as the state as a whole has trended strongly Republican. Pockets of Republican influence exist in the wealthier portions of the city, but they are usually no match for the overwhelming Democratic trend in the rest of the city. The issue of school busing roiled politics for years but subsided after the 1990s. While local elections are officially nonpartisan, nearly all the city's elected officials are publicly known as Democrats. The city is split among 10 state house districts, all of which are held by Democrats. Three state senate districts and part of a fourth are within the county; three are held by Democrats and one by a Republican.

In the state legislature, Nashville politicians serve as leaders of both the Senate and House Democratic Caucuses. Representative Mike Stewart serves as Chairman of the House Caucus. Senator Jeff Yarbro serves as Chairman of the Senate Caucus.

Democrats are no less dominant at the federal level. Democratic presidential candidates have failed to carry Davidson County only five times since Reconstruction; in 1928, 1968, 1972, 1984 and 1988. In most years, Democrats have carried Nashville at the presidential level with relatively little difficulty, even in years when they lose Tennessee as a whole. This has been especially true in recent elections, as the state capitol has continued to trend more Democratic even as most of the rest of the state has become staunchly Republican. In the 2000 presidential election, Tennessean Democrat Al Gore carried Nashville with over 59% of the vote even as he narrowly lost his home state and thus the presidency. In the 2004 election, Democrat John Kerry carried Nashville with 55% of the vote while George W. Bush won the state by 14 points. In 2008, Barack Obama carried Nashville with 60% of the vote while Republican John McCain won Tennessee by 15 points.

Despite its large size, Nashville was in a single congressional district, the 5th, for most of its history. Until 2023, a Republican had not represented a significant portion of Nashville since 1874, when the GOP-controlled state legislature controversially split Nashville into part of the 5th, 6th, and 7th districts in an effort to gerrymander an additional Republican to Tennessee's congressional delegation as part of the 2022 redistricting cycle. Republicans made a few spirited challenges to the 5th district in the mid-1960s and early 1970s. The Republicans almost won it in 1968; only a strong showing by a candidate from Wallace's American Independent Party kept the seat in Democratic hands. The last serious bid for the district while still a Democratic stronghold was in 1972, when the Republican candidate gained only 38% of the vote even as Nixon carried the district in the presidential election by a large margin. The district's best-known congressman was probably Jo Byrns, who represented the district from 1909 to 1936 and was Speaker of the House for much of Franklin Roosevelt's first term as president. Another nationally prominent congressman from Nashville was Percy Priest, who represented the district from 1941 to 1956 and was House Majority Whip from 1949 to 1953. Former mayors Richard Fulton and Bill Boner also sat in the U.S. House before assuming the Metro mayoral office. 

From 2003 to 2013, a sliver of southwestern Nashville was located in the 7th District, represented by Republican Marsha Blackburn. This area was roughly coextensive with the portion of Nashville she had represented in the state senate from 1998 to 2002. However, the 5th regained all of Nashville after the 2010 census.

Crime
According to the FBI's Uniform Crime Reporting database, Metropolitan Nashville has a violent crime rate approximately three times the national average, and a property crime rate approximately 1.6 times the average. The following table shows Nashville's crime rate per 100,000 inhabitants for seven UCR categories.

Education

The city is served by Metropolitan Nashville Public Schools, also referred to as Metro Schools. This district is the second largest school district in Tennessee, and enrolls approximately 85,000 students at 169 schools. In addition, Nashville is home to numerous private schools, including Montgomery Bell Academy, Harpeth Hall School, University School of Nashville, Lipscomb Academy, The Ensworth School, Christ Presbyterian Academy, Father Ryan High School, Pope John Paul II High School, Franklin Road Academy, Davidson Academy, Nashville Christian School, Donelson Christian Academy, and St. Cecilia Academy. Combined, all of the private schools in Nashville enroll more than 15,000 students.

Colleges and universities

Nashville has been labeled the "Athens of the South" due to the many colleges and universities in the metropolitan area. Total enrollment in post-secondary education in Nashville is around 43,000.

The largest is Vanderbilt University, with about 13,000 students. Vanderbilt is considered one of the nation's leading research universities and is particularly known for its medical, law, and education programs.

Nashville is home to more historically Black institutions of higher education than any other city save for Atlanta, Georgia: Fisk University, Tennessee State University, Meharry Medical College, and American Baptist College.

Other schools based in Nashville include Belmont University, Lipscomb University, Trevecca Nazarene University, John A. Gupton College. The Tennessee Board of Regents operates Nashville State Community College and the Nashville branch of the Tennessee Colleges of Applied Technology.

Other nearby institutes of higher education include Murfreesboro's Middle Tennessee State University (MTSU), a full-sized public university with Tennessee's second-largest undergraduate population; Daymar College in Franklin; and Cumberland University in Lebanon.

Media

The daily newspaper in Nashville is The Tennessean, which until 1998 competed with the Nashville Banner, another daily paper that was housed in the same building under a joint-operating agreement. The Tennessean is the city's most widely circulated newspaper. Online news service NashvillePost.com competes with the printed dailies to break local and state news. Several weekly papers are also published in Nashville, including The Nashville Pride, Nashville Business Journal, Nashville Scene and The Tennessee Tribune. Historically, The Tennessean was associated with a broadly liberal editorial policy, while The Banner carried staunchly conservative views in its editorial pages; The Banners heritage had been carried on, to an extent, by The City Paper which folded in August 2013 after having been founded in October 2000. The Nashville Scene is the area's alternative weekly broadsheet. The Nashville Pride is aimed towards community development and serves Nashville's entrepreneurial population. Nashville Post is an online news source covering business, politics and sports.

Nashville is home to eleven broadcast television stations, although most households are served by direct cable network connections. Comcast Cable has a monopoly on terrestrial cable service in Davidson County (but not throughout the entire media market). Nashville is ranked as the 29th largest television market in the United States. Major stations include WKRN-TV 2 (ABC), WSMV-TV 4 (NBC), WTVF 5 (CBS), WNPT 8 (PBS), WTNX-LD 15 (Telemundo), WZTV 17 (Fox), WNPX-TV 28 (ion), WPGD-TV 50 (TBN), WLLC-LD 42 (Univision), WUXP-TV 30 (MyNetworkTV), (WJFB) 44 (MeTV), and WNAB 58 (CW).

Nashville is also home to cable networks Country Music Television (CMT), among others. CMT's master control facilities are located in New York City with other Viacom properties. The Top 20 Countdown and CMT Insider are taped in their Nashville studios. Shop at Home Network was once based in Nashville, but the channel signed off in 2008.

Several FM and AM radio stations broadcast in the Nashville area, including five college stations and one LPFM community radio station. Nashville is ranked as the 44th largest radio market in the United States. WSM-FM is owned by Cumulus Media and is 95.5 FM. WSM-AM, owned by Gaylord Entertainment Company, can be heard nationally on 650 AM or online at WSM Online from its studios located inside the Gaylord Opryland Resort & Convention Center. WSM is famous for carrying live broadcasts of the Grand Ole Opry, through which it helped spread the popularity of country music in America, and continues to broadcast country music throughout its broadcast day. WLAC, whose over-the-air signal is heard at 1510 AM, is an iHeartMedia-owned talk station which was originally sponsored by the Life and Casualty Insurance Company of Tennessee, and its competitor WWTN is owned by Cumulus.

Several major motion pictures have been filmed in Nashville, including The Green Mile, The Last Castle, Gummo, The Thing Called Love, Two Weeks, Coal Miner's Daughter, Nashville, and Country Strong, as well as the ABC television series Nashville.

Infrastructure

Transportation
According to the 2016 American Community Survey, 78.1% of working Nashville residents commuted by driving alone, 9.8% carpooled, 2% used public transportation, and 2.2% walked. About 1.1% used all other forms of transportation, including taxicab, motorcycle, and bicycle. About 6.7% of working Nashville residents worked at home. In 2015, 7.9% of city of Nashville households were without a car; this figure decreased to 5.9% in 2016. The national average was 8.7 percent in 2016. Nashville averaged 1.72 cars per household in 2016, compared to a national average of 1.8 per household.

Highways
Nashville is centrally located at the crossroads of three Interstate Highways, I-40 (east-west), I-24 (northwest-southeast) and I-65 (north-south). I-40 connects the city between Memphis to the west and Knoxville to the east, I-24 connects between Clarksville to the northwest and Chattanooga to the southeast, and I-65 connects between Louisville, Kentucky to the north and Huntsville, Alabama to the south. All three of these interstate highways, which also serve the suburbs, form brief concurrencies with each other in the city, and completely encircle downtown. Interstate 440 is a bypass route connecting I-40, I-65, and I-24 south of downtown Nashville. Briley Parkway, the majority of which is a freeway, forms a bypass around the north side of the city and its interstates. Ellington Parkway, a freeway made up of a section of U.S. Route 31E, runs between east of downtown and Briley Parkway, serving as an alternative route to I-65. Interstate 840 provides an outer southern bypass for the city and its suburbs. U.S. Routes 31, 31E, 31W, 31 Alternate, 41, 41 Alternate, 70, 70S, and 431 also serve Nashville, intersecting in the city's center as arterial surface roads and radiating outward. Most of these routes are called "pikes" and many carry the names of nearby towns to which they lead. Among these are Clarksville Pike, Gallatin Pike, Lebanon Pike, Murfreesboro Pike, Nolensville Pike, and Franklin Pike.

Public transit

The Metropolitan Transit Authority provides bus transit within the city. Routes utilize a hub and spoke method, centered around the Music City Central transit station in downtown. A rejected expansion plan included use of bus rapid transit and light rail service at some point in the future.

Nashville is considered a gateway city for rail and air traffic for the Piedmont Atlantic Megaregion.

Air

The city is served by Nashville International Airport (BNA), which is operated by the Metropolitan Nashville Airport Authority (MNAA). 18.27 million passengers visited the airport in 2019, making it the 31st busiest airport in the US. BNA is ranked fastest growing airport among the top 50 airports in the United States. Nashville International Airport serves 600 daily flights to more than 85 nonstop markets.

In late 2014, BNA became the first major U.S. airport to establish dedicated pick-up and drop-off areas for vehicle for hire companies.

The airport authority also operates the John C. Tune Airport, a Class E airspace general aviation airport.

Intercity rail

Although a major freight hub for CSX Transportation, Nashville is not currently served by Amtrak, the third-largest metropolitan area in the U.S. to have this distinction. Nashville's Union Station had once been a major intercity passenger rail center for the Louisville and Nashville Railroad; Nashville, Chattanooga and St. Louis Railway; and the Tennessee Central Railway, reaching Midwestern cities and cities on the Gulf of Mexico and the Atlantic Ocean. However, by the time of Amtrak's founding, service had been cut back to a single train, the Floridian, which ran from Chicago to Miami and St. Petersburg, Florida. It served Union Station until its cancellation on October 9, 1979, due to poor track conditions resulting in late trains and low ridership, ending over 120 years of intercity rail service in Nashville.

While there have been few proposals to restore Amtrak service to Nashville, there have been repeated calls from residents. In addition to scarce federal funding, Tennessee state officials do not believe that Nashville is large enough to support intercity rail. "It would be wonderful to say I can be in Memphis and jump on a train to Nashville, but the volume of people who would do that isn't anywhere close to what the cost would be to provide the service," said Ed Cole, chief of environment and planning with the Tennessee Department of Transportation. Ross Capon, executive director of the National Association of Railroad Passengers, said rail trips would catch on if routes were expanded, but conceded that it would be nearly impossible to resume Amtrak service to Nashville without a substantial investment from the state. However, in 2020, Amtrak indicated it was considering a service that would run from Atlanta to Nashville by way of Chattanooga.

Nashville launched a passenger commuter rail system called the Music City Star on September 18, 2006. The only currently operational leg of the system connects the city of Lebanon to downtown Nashville at the Nashville Riverfront station. Legs to Clarksville, Murfreesboro and Gallatin are currently in the feasibility study stage. The system plan includes seven legs connecting Nashville to surrounding suburbs.

Bridges
Bridges within the city include:

Utilities
The city of Nashville owns the Nashville Electric Service (NES),  Metro Water Services (MWS) and Nashville District Energy System (NDES). The Nashville Electric Service provides electricity to the entirety of Davidson County and small portions of the six adjacent counties, and purchases its power from the Tennessee Valley Authority. Metro Water Services provides water, wastewater, and stormwater to Nashville and the majority of Davidson County, as well as water services to small portions of Rutherford and Williamson counties, and wastewater services to small portions of all of the surrounding counties except for Cheatham County. MWS sources its water from the Cumberland River and operates two water treatment plants and three wastewater treatment plants. Ten additional utility companies provide water and sewer service to Nashville and Davidson County. The Nashville District Energy System provides heating and cooling services to certain buildings in downtown, including multiple government buildings. Natural gas is provided by Piedmont Natural Gas, a subsidiary of Duke Energy.

Healthcare

As a major center for the healthcare industry, Nashville is home to several hospitals and other primary care facilities. Most hospitals in Nashville are operated by Vanderbilt University Medical Center, the TriStar Division of Hospital Corporation of America, and Saint Thomas Health. The Metropolitan Nashville Hospital Authority operates Nashville General Hospital, which is affiliated with Meharry Medical College.

Sister cities
Nashville's sister cities are:

 Belfast, United Kingdom
 Caen, France
 Chengdu, China
 Edmonton, Canada
 Kamakura, Japan
 Magdeburg, Germany
 Diyarbakir, Turkey
 Mendoza, Argentina
 Taiyuan, China
 Tamworth, Australia

Candidates
 Gwangjin (Seoul), South Korea

International Friendship City
 Crouy, France

See also
 List of people from Nashville, Tennessee
 Metropolitan Development and Housing Agency
 The Children, 1999 book about the Nashville Student Movement
 National Register of Historic Places listings in Davidson County, Tennessee
 USS Nashville, 3 ships

Notes

References

Bibliography

External links

Government
 Official website

Other
 Nashville Convention & Visitors Bureau
 Nashville Area Chamber of Commerce
 Metropolitan Archives of Nashville and Davidson County
 Nashville/Davidson County timeline from the Nashville Public Library

 
Cities in Tennessee
Cities in Davidson County, Tennessee
Consolidated city-counties
County seats in Tennessee
Populated places established in 1779
Cities in Nashville metropolitan area
1779 establishments in North Carolina
Railway towns in Tennessee